Theodor Strünck (7 April 1895, Pries - 9 April 1945, Flossenbürg concentration camp) was a German lawyer and resistance worker, involved in the 20 July plot.

Life
Theodor Strünck studied legal science, graduating at the University of Rostock in 1924, and became a lawyer (later a director) at an insurance company.  Initially sympathising with National Socialism, he then turned to opposing the regime on their seizure of power and the subsequent decline in the rule of law.  In 1937 he became a Hauptmann in Germany's reserve forces, working in the Wehrmacht section of the Amt Ausland/Abwehr under Hans Oster.  He came into contact with Carl Goerdeler and organised meetings of German Resistance members in his own home.

For his participation in the 20 July 1944 plot, Theodor Strünck was arrested on 1 August, dishonourably discharged from the army on 24 August as part of the "Ehrenhof" (so that the Reichskriegsgericht or Reich Courts Martial would no longer have control of his sentencing), and on 10 October condemned to death by the People's Court under its president Roland Freisler.  He was then imprisoned in Flossenbürg concentration camp, where he, Dietrich Bonhoeffer, Wilhelm Canaris, Ludwig Gehre, Hans Oster and Karl Sack were executed together by hanging on 9 April 1945.

External links
 Ev. Kirchengem. Charlottenburg-Nord:Biography 
 GDW: Biography

1895 births
1945 deaths
20th-century German lawyers
Executed members of the 20 July plot
People who died in Flossenbürg concentration camp
People from Schleswig-Holstein executed in Nazi concentration camps
Resistance members who died in Nazi concentration camps
German civilians killed in World War II
People executed by Nazi Germany by hanging
Jurists from Kiel